Sean O'Connell (born September 2, 1983) is a retired American professional mixed martial artist who most recently competed and won a title in the Light Heavyweight division of the Professional Fighters League. A professional competitor since 2007, O'Connell has formerly competed for the Ultimate Fighting Championship and Maximum Fighting Championship.

Background
Originally from Cottage Grove, Minnesota, O'Connell competed in football and wrestling at Jordan High School in Sandy, Utah before continuing his football career collegiately. While in high school O'Connell was a member of the coveted football group Pain Train, which was reserved for only the toughest members of the offensive line.  However, O'Connell would transfer to three different schools including Southern Utah University and The University of Utah where he made the team as a walk-on, while looking to get more playing time. O'Connell turned his attention to mixed martial arts to supplement his Football training. O'Connell graduated from The University of Utah, with a degree in psychology. He also attended Weber State.

Mixed martial arts career

Early career
O'Connell made his professional MMA debut in 2007 with no previous training other than cardio kickboxing which he would do to help stay in shape. Despite having limited training, O'Connell was successful early on in his career and held an overall record of 6–2, which earned him an invitation to compete on The Ultimate Fighter: Team Nogueira vs. Team Mir. O'Connell, however, was eliminated in the opening round to make it to the final cast. O'Connell, who also ran a sports talk show for a radio station in San Francisco at the time was on a five-fight winning streak and held an overall professional record of 14–4, before inviting UFC president Dana White to come onto his show. O'Connell asked White for a contract live on air and was signed a year later. O'Connell was the co-host of a popular sports talk radio show on ESPN700 in Utah called The OC and Hackett Show

Ultimate Fighting Championship
O'Connell made his promotional debut as a short notice injury replacement at The Ultimate Fighter Nations Finale on April 16, 2014, against Ryan Jimmo. O'Connell was defeated via knockout in the first round.

His next appearance was also a short notice fight against Gian Villante on June 28, 2014, at UFC Fight Night 43, where he replaced an injured Anthony Perosh. O'Connell lost the fight via split decision.  Their performance earned both participants Fight of the Night honors.

On January 18, 2015, O'Connell then faced Matt Van Buren at UFC Fight Night 59.; he won via third-round TKO.  Both participants earned Fight of the Night honors on the same card as Conor McGregor. He then faced Anthony Perosh on May 10, 2015, at UFC Fight Night 65. He won the fight via TKO in the first round.

O'Connell is well known for his weigh-in antics before professional fights. This became his signature as video circulation of his UFC weigh-ins boosted viewership. Goofs include booping Matt Van Buren on the nose or playing an improvised game of rock-paper-scissors with Perosh. He claims he does his jokes to add levity to an otherwise tense situation.

O'Connell faced Ilir Latifi on January 17, 2016, at UFC Fight Night 81. He lost the fight by knockout in the first round.

O'Connell next faced Steve Bossé on June 18, 2016, at UFC Fight Night 89. Bossé was awarded a unanimous decision victory. The back and forth action earned both participants Fight of the Night honors.

O'Connell faced Corey Anderson on December 9, 2016, at UFC Fight Night 102. He lost the fight by TKO in the second round.

Professional Fighters League
O'Connell signed with PFL in 2018. In his debut, he faced Ronny Markes at PFL 2 on June 21, 2018, in Chicago, Illinois, winning the fight by TKO in the second round.

In his second fight for the promotion, O'Connell faced Bazigit Atajev at PFL 7 on August 30, 2018. He lost the fight via TKO in the first round.

In the fall of 2018, O'Connell entered the PFL Light Heavyweight tournament. At PFL 9 on October 13, 2018, he defeated Dan Spohn by majority decision in the quarterfinal round and then fought Smealinho Rama in the semifinal round the same night, winning by knockout. O'Connell faced Vinny Magalhães in the finals at PFL 11 on December 31, 2018. He won the back-and-forth fight via TKO between the third and fourth round after Vinny Magalhães stopped the bout. With the win, O'Connell was crowned the 2018 PFL Light Heavyweight champion and earned the $1 million cash prize.
Of note O’Connell worked as a broadcaster for the PFL commentating cage-side once on the same night as one of his own fights. O’Connell was hired as part of the Professional Fighters League broadcast team after his retirement as cage-side play by play announcer.

Retirement 
Following his 2018 PFL tournament win, O'Connell announced he was retiring from MMA competition.

Championships and accomplishments

Mixed martial arts
Professional Fighters League
2018 Light Heavyweight Champion
Ultimate Fighting Championship
Fight of the Night (Three times)

Mixed martial arts record

|-
|Win
|align=center|21–10
|Vinny Magalhães
|TKO (corner stoppage)
|PFL 11
|
|align=center|3
|align=center|5:00
|New York City, New York, United States 
|
|-
|Win
|align=center|20–10
|Smealinho Rama
|KO (punches)
| rowspan=2 | PFL 9
| rowspan=2 | 
| align=center| 1
| align=center| 1:45
| rowspan=2 | Long Beach, California, United States
|
|-
|Win
|align=center|19–10
|Dan Spohn
|Decision (majority)
| align=center| 2
| align=center| 5:00
|
|-
|Loss
|align=center|18–10
|Bazigit Atajev
|TKO (spinning back kick and punches)
|PFL 7
|
|align=center| 1
|align=center| 3:30
|Atlantic City, New Jersey, United States
|
|-
|Win
|align=center|18–9
|Ronny Markes
|TKO (punches)
|PFL 2
|
|align=center|2
|align=center|0:41
|Chicago, Illinois, United States
|
|-
|Loss
|align=center|17–9
|Corey Anderson 
|TKO (punches)
|UFC Fight Night: Lewis vs. Abdurakhimov 
|
|align=center|2
|align=center|2:36
|Albany, New York, United States 
|
|-
|Loss
|align=center|17–8
|Steve Bossé
|Decision (unanimous)
|UFC Fight Night: MacDonald vs. Thompson
|
|align=center|3
|align=center|5:00
|Ottawa, Ontario, Canada
|    
|-
|Loss
|align=center|17–7
|Ilir Latifi
|KO (punches)
|UFC Fight Night: Dillashaw vs. Cruz
|
|align=center|1
|align=center|0:30
|Boston, Massachusetts, United States
|     
|-
|Win
|align=center| 17–6
|Anthony Perosh
|TKO (punches)
|UFC Fight Night: Miocic vs. Hunt
| 
|align=center|1
|align=center|0:56
|Adelaide, Australia
|
|-
| Win
|align=center| 16–6
| Matt Van Buren
| TKO (punches) 
| UFC Fight Night: McGregor vs. Siver
| 
|align=center|3
|align=center|2:11
|Boston, Massachusetts, United States
|
|-
| Loss
|align=center| 15–6
| Gian Villante
| Decision (split)
| UFC Fight Night: Te-Huna vs. Marquardt
| 
|align=center|3
|align=center|5:00
|Auckland, New Zealand
|
|-
| Loss
|align=center| 15–5
| Ryan Jimmo
| KO (punches)
| The Ultimate Fighter Nations Finale: Bisping vs. Kennedy
| 
|align=center| 1
|align=center| 4:27
|Quebec City, Quebec, Canada
|
|-
| Win
|align=center| 15–4
| Markhaile Wedderburn
| Submission (rear-naked choke)
| MFC 39
| 
|align=center| 1
|align=center| 1:48
|Edmonton, Alberta, Canada
| 
|-
| Win
|align=center| 14–4
| Marvin Eastman
| Decision (unanimous)
| Showdown Fights 12
| 
|align=center| 3
|align=center| 5:00
|Orem, Utah, United States
| 
|-
| Win
|align=center| 13–4
| Chris Guillen
| TKO (punches)
| Showdown Fights 9
| 
|align=center| 3
|align=center| 0:21
|Orem, Utah, United States
|
|-
| Win
|align=center| 12–4
| Kip Ramos
| TKO (punches)
| Showdown Fights 7
| 
|align=center| 1
|align=center| 0:33
|Orem, Utah, United States
|
|-
| Win
|align=center| 11–4
| Trevor Carlson
| Decision (unanimous)
| Showdown Fights 6
| 
|align=center| 3
|align=center| 5:00
|Orem, Utah, United States
| 
|-
| Win
|align=center| 10–4
| Ben Fuimaono
| TKO (punches)
| Fight Night: Explosion
| 
|align=center| 1
|align=center| 4:34
|Salt Lake City, Utah, United States
| 
|-
| Loss
|align=center| 9–4
| Joseph Henle
| Submission (rear-naked choke)
| ZarMMA: Fight Night
| 
|align=center| 2
|align=center| 1:15
|Layton, Utah, United States
| 
|-
| Win
|align=center| 9–3
| Tony King
| Decision (unanimous)
| UFO: Rumble at the Races
| 
|align=center| 3
|align=center| 5:00
|Kennewick, Washington, United States
| 
|-
| Win
|align=center| 8–3
| Dwight Parker
| Submission (rear-naked choke)
| WCFC: World Championship Full Contact
| 
|align=center| 2
|align=center| 1:49
|Salt Lake City, Utah, United States
| 
|-
| Loss
|align=center| 7–3
| Jordan Smith
| Submission (rear-naked choke)
| Throwdown Showdown 3
| 
|align=center| 1
|align=center| 2:30
|Salt Lake City, Utah, United States
| 
|-
| Win
|align=center| 7–2
| Hank Weiss
| Decision
| Jeremy Horn's Elite Fight Night 5
| 
|align=center| 3
|align=center| 5:00
|Layton, Utah, United States
| 
|-
| Loss
|align=center| 6–2
| Hank Weiss
| KO (punches)
| Jeremy Horn's Elite Fight Night 1
| 
|align=center| 2
|align=center| 0:08
|Layton, Utah, United States
| 
|-
| Win
|align=center| 6–1
| Lima Pule
| Submission (rear-naked choke)
| UCE: Worlds Collide
| 
|align=center| 2
|align=center| 3:28
|Salt Lake City, Utah, United States
| 
|-
| Win
|align=center| 5–1
| Lima Pule
| Decision (majority)
| UCE: Episode 6
| 
|align=center| 3
|align=center| 
|Salt Lake City, Utah, United States
| 
|-
| Win
|align=center| 4–1
| David Thomas
| TKO (punches)
| UCE: Episode 6
| 
|align=center| 2
|align=center| 2:44
|Salt Lake City, Utah, United States
| 
|-
| Loss
|align=center| 3–1
| Kevin Hill
| TKO (punches)
| UCE: Episode 1
| 
|align=center| 1
|align=center| 0:47
|Salt Lake City, Utah, United States
| 
|-
| Win
|align=center| 3–0
| Eric Wenzel
| TKO (punches)
| UCE: Finals
| 
|align=center| 1
|align=center| 1:24
|Salt Lake City, Utah United States
| 
|-
| Win
|align=center| 2–0
| Kenneth Wirfs
| KO (punches) 
| UCE: Episode 7
| 
|align=center| 1
|align=center| 0:37
|Salt Lake City, Utah, United States
| 
|-
| Win
|align=center| 1–0
| Jason Delrio
| KO (punches) 
| UCE: Episode 2
| 
|align=center| 1
|align=center| 0:36
|Salt Lake City, Utah, United States
| 
|-

See also
 List of current UFC fighters
 List of male mixed martial artists

References

External links
 
 
 

Living people
1983 births
American male mixed martial artists
Mixed martial artists from Minnesota
Light heavyweight mixed martial artists
Heavyweight mixed martial artists
Mixed martial artists utilizing wrestling
Ultimate Fighting Championship male fighters